Akkamappettai Paramasivan Nagarajan (24 February 1928  – 5 April 1977) was an Indian film director, producer, actor and writer who set a trend in film making in Tamil cinema from 1965 to 1977.

Film career

Nagarajan started his own drama company, the Pazhani Kadiravan Nadaga Sabha, and, in 1949, married Rani Ammal. He wrote and acted in several plays and one of his plays "Nalvar" was made into a movie. Nagarajan wrote the screenplay for his own story and play the hero in this film. His film career thus began in 1953.

He also acted in many movies for producer M. A. Venu, formerly of Modern Theatres, such as Mangalyam, Nalla Thangal and Pennarasi. He wrote the screenplay for Town Bus and by 1956 decided to focus on writing. He wrote Naan Petra Selvam and Makkalai Petra Maharasi — in the latter, he introduced the ‘Kongu' Tamil accent for the hero. The first of his many mythological films — Sampoorna Ramayanam (1958) — was a big success, and Rajaji, who had little regard for cinema, watched this film and praised Sivaji Ganesan's performance as Bharatha in it. He then started to produce in partnership with actor V. K. Ramasamy. Some of the works of this period include Nalla Idaththu Sammandham (1958), Thayai Pol Pillai, Noolai Pol Selai (1959) and Paavai Vilakku. He made his directorial debut with Vadivukku Valaigaappu (1962). He launched his own production company with Navarathri and then went on to make a mark in the field of mythological cinema as well.

Filmography

Death
He died of cardiac arrest on 1 April 1977 in Chennai, Tamil Nadu, India, aged 49.

Awards
 He won Filmfare Award for Best Film - Tamil - Thiruvilaiyadal (1965)

References

External links 
 

1928 births
1977 deaths
Film directors from Tamil Nadu
Tamil film directors
Telugu film directors
20th-century Indian film directors
People from Tiruvarur district
Tamil film producers
Film producers from Tamil Nadu
20th-century Indian dramatists and playwrights
Screenwriters from Tamil Nadu
Tamil screenwriters
Politicians from Coimbatore
20th-century Indian screenwriters